Club Deportivo Alfonso Ugarte (sometimes referred as Alfonso Ugarte de Tacna) is a Peruvian football club, playing in the city of Tacna, Tacna, Peru.

History
The Club Deportivo Alfonso Ugarte was founded on October 9, 1929.

In the 2005 Copa Perú, the club classified to the Regional Stage, but was eliminated by Senati and Social Chalaca.

In the 2006 Copa Perú, the club classified to the Regional Stage, but was eliminated by Senati and Deportivo GER.

Rivalries
Alfonso Ugarte has had a long-standing rivalry with local club Coronel Bolognesi. The rivalry between Ugarte and Bolognesi known as the Clásico Tacneño.

Honours

Regional
Liga Departamental de Tacna:
Winners (2): 2005, 2006

Liga Provincial de Tacna:
Winners (3): 1945, 1956, 2005
Runner-up (1): 1955

See also
List of football clubs in Peru
Peruvian football league system

References

External links
 

Football clubs in Peru
Association football clubs established in 1929
1929 establishments in Peru